is an anime series aired from 1977 to 1978 in Japan. There are 44 episodes aired at 25 minutes each.  It is also known as "Arrow Emblem Grand Prix no Taka".  In the United States, it was re-edited to a short movie called "Super Grand Prix".

Original story
The story is about a young man named Takaya Todoroki who dreams of becoming a F1 racer.  He puts all his energy into winning a beginners heat in stock cars, but slips on oil when in the lead due to a momentary loss of focus and has an accident. This makes Takaya lose his confidence and initially swear to give up racing. Then a masked stranger appears by his bedside in the hospital who introduced himself as the world-famous driver "Nick" (Niki Lauda in other languages). He encourages him to dust himself off and try driving a new prototype.  Before long, he is a team member of "Katori Motors", hoping to become a world F1 champion, driving the "Todoroki special", a car built to his own design.

Production notes
The show's Japanese name "Grand Prix no taka" translates as "Hawk of Grand Prix", a theme that often recurs in the opening animation. The main character's name was probably chosen to suit this theme as well.

In the US the 44-episode series was significantly shortened to form a 90-minute movie for children called "Super Grand Prix" released by Liberty International on August 12, 2003.  The story is essentially the same, except Takaya is now known as "Sean Corrigan" and nicknamed "Crash Corrigan" for the crash.

Staff
Creator: Kogo Hotomi

Planning: Kenji Yokoyama, Koji Bessho, Takeshi Tamiya

Chief Directors: Rintaro, Nobutaka Nishizawa

Additional Directors: Nobutaka Nishizawa, Yugo Serikawa, Takenori Kawada, Yasuo Yamayoshi, Katsutoshi Sasaki, Rintaro, Osamu Kasai, Susumu Ishizaki, Tokiji Kaburagi

Screenwriters: Masaki Tsuji, Keisuke Fujikawa, Shozo Uehara

Original Character Designer: Akio Sugino

Animation Character Designers: Kenzo Koizumi, Takuo Noda

Mechanical Concept Designer: Dan Kobayashi

Art Designers: Tadanao Tsuji, Mukuo Takamura

Animation Directors: Bunpei Nanjo, Eiji Kamimura, Takeshi Shirato, Toshio Mori, Kazuo Komatsubara, Kenzo Koizumi, Sadayoshi Tominaga, Takuo Noda

Music: Hiroshi Miyagawa

Theme Song Performance: Ichiro Mizuki

Production: Fuji TV, Toei Animation

Home media
There are 2 DVD releases for the series, a 4 disc set and a 5 disc set.

Merchandise
There were a number of Arrow Emblem race cars released under the Popynica toyline by Popy Pleasure in 1978 and 1979.

PB-34  	Todoroki Special

PB-35  	Todoroki Special, mark 2

PB-36  	Todoroki Special, mark 3

PB-37 	DX Todoroki Special 	

PB-38 	Katori Super Roman 	

PB-39 	Katori Rally Version 	

PB-40 	DX Katori Super Roman 	

PB-41 	Anchor 	

PB-44 	DX Anchor

PB-45 	Countach LP500S

Aside from these model cars, Popy also made a 1:1 scale racing helmet which could be worn by children. Unfortunately the serial number for this helmet is unknown.

References to two other pieces of merchandise have been found:
 A slotracing track, created by Bandai.
 A garage kit of the Todoroki Special, created by Club M

Trivia
 It was aired every week Thursday 7:00pm to 7:30pm.
 The character Nick is evidently based on Austrian world champion F1 driver Niki Lauda. While Nick is only referred to as "Masked Man" (due to the mask he wears) in the English dub 'Super Grand Prix', the character does specifically mention the name Lauda during the flashback sequence in which he is discussing his own past. 
 Apart from Lauda, the series also featured other thinly disguised popular Formula One drivers from the 1970s, including Mario Andretti, Vittorio Brambilla, Emerson Fittipaldi, James Hunt, Clay Regazzoni and Jody Scheckter.
 The design of the 'Todoroki Special' was inspired by the 1976 Tyrrell P34 'six wheeler' designed by Derek Gardner.

References

External links
 

1977 anime television series debuts
1978 Japanese television series endings
Fuji TV original programming
Toei Animation television
Motorsports in anime and manga
Animated television series about auto racing